La Diva may refer to:

 La Diva (group), a Filipino girl group
 La Diva (Aretha Franklin album), 1979
 La Diva (Katherine Jenkins album), 2004
 La Diva, Ivy Queen's nickname
 Diva (Ivy Queen album), 2004

See also
Diva (disambiguation)